MQTV (abbreviated from Manajemen Qolbu Televisi) is an Islamic-based local television station serving Bandung, West Java, Indonesia and surrounding areas. The station is owned by Daarut Tauhiid Foundation (Yayasan Daarut Tauhiid), an Islamic organization founded by prominent Indonesian preacher Abdullah Gymnastiar (Aa Gym). MQTV studios are located on Jalan Gegerkalong, Sukasari, Bandung, and its transmitter is located in Jambudipa, Cisarua, Bandung.

History 
Before the creation of MQTV, Daarut Tauhiid Foundation has already had a radio station MQFM which was founded in 2001.

MQTV was founded on 22 June 2002, originally as a production house specializing in lectures by Aa Gym as well as other Islamic television programming. In 2003 MQTV had 5 managers, 23 animation staff, and 18 administration and production staff; and the MQTV brand was increasingly recognized in the national television.

MQTV later enter terrestrial television by signing on a station on 1 May 2006, after undergoing a trial broadcast starting on 28 October 2003. The station could be considered the first Islamic-based television station in Indonesia, albeit on a local scale (the first Islamic-oriented station/network/channel should be a national-scale Global TV, now GTV, originally founded in 1999 by ICMI and IIFTIHAR organization but sold to Bimantara Citra, currently MNC, before its actual launch as a generalist network in 2002).

References

External links 
 Official website
 Indonesian Television Archive
Television stations in Indonesia
Television channels and stations established in 2006
2002 establishments in Indonesia
Mass media in Bandung
Television channels and stations established in 2002